The Mayor of Hartlepool was the executive mayor of Hartlepool Borough Council in County Durham, England. Established in 2002 and abolished in 2013, all three terms of office were served by Stuart Drummond.

The office was established in 2002 following a referendum the previous year in which governance by a directly elected mayor was favoured over a cabinet system. Another referendum in 2012 produced the converse result, and the office was abolished in May 2013.

Drummond was first elected in 2002 and was re-elected in 2005 and 2009. Drummond was the first mayor in Britain to win a third term.

Referendums

Elections
Elections were held under the supplementary vote system.

2002

2005

2009

List of mayors

References

Hartlepool

Borough of Hartlepool